Armbrust (German: Crossbow) is a lightweight unguided anti-tank weapon designed and developed by Messerschmitt-Bölkow-Blohm of Germany, who later sold its manufacturing rights to Chartered Industries of Singapore (the predecessor of ST Kinetics).

Overview

The Armbrust is a recoilless weapon, and is one of the few weapons of this kind that may safely be fired in an enclosed space. The propellant charge is placed between two pistons with the projectile in front of one and a mass of shredded plastic in the rear. Unlike most recoilless weapons, it is a true counter-shot weapon, as the mass of the projectile is equal to the mass of the counterweight and they are ejected from the barrel at the same initial velocity. When the weapon is fired, the propellant expands, pushing the two pistons out. The projectile is forced out of the front and the plastic out of the back. The plastic disperses on leaving the back of the barrel, and is quickly stopped by air resistance. The pistons jam at either end of the barrel, locking the hot gases inside. Its warhead can penetrate up to 300 mm of steel armor.

Since 2004, Armbrusts have gradually been replaced by the Israeli-German-Singapore co-developed MATADOR.

Combat use
During the Cambodian–Vietnamese War, Armbrust was supplied to the Cambodian Khmer Rouge. It was used in their fight against the Cambodian government, as well as against Vietnamese Army. Cuban troops in Angola captured several Armbrust launchers from UNITA during the late 1980s.

Operators

Current operators

: Komando Pasukan Katak (Kopaska) tactical diver group and Komando Pasukan Khusus (Kopassus) special forces group.
: Philippine Army, Philippine Marine Corps, Presidential Security Group

See also
PzF 44
Panzerfaust 3

References

External links
Jane's: ST Kinetics Armbrust short-range anti-armour weapon
Armbrust antitank grenade launcher - Modern Firearms 

Weapons of Singapore
Cold War anti-tank rockets of Germany
Military equipment introduced in the 1970s